The University of Florida College of Health and Human Performance is an academic college of the University of Florida.  The College of Health and Human Performance was founded in 1946 and is located on the university's Gainesville, Florida campus.  The college has four departments and four research centers.  The college is unique in that the majors that are offered are inter-disciplinary in nature.  As of 2021, there were more than 2,900 undergraduate and graduate students enrolled in the college. In 2022 the College of Health and Human Performance generated $10 million in research expenditures.

Departments
 Applied Physiology and Kinesiology 
 Health Education and Behavior 
 Sport Management 
 Tourism, Hospitality and Event Management

Deans of the College of Health and Human Performance

References

External links
 Official website
 Facts about the College
 College overview
 Breakdown of the Departments
 Capital Campaign info for the College

Health and Human Performance
Educational institutions established in 1946
1946 establishments in Florida